Abertillery Learning Community is an all-through school in Abertillery, Wales.

The school was formed by merging several schools in 2016. Abertillery Comprehensive School was originally opened in 1986, on a former colliery site. This school was merged with four local primary schools.

As of 2020, the school's most recent Estyn inspection was in 2018, with a judgement that the school needs significant improvement.

In 2019, the school was undergoing a review of teaching, with some posts likely to be cut; at this point the school had had three headteachers in two years.

The Four Campuses

Secondary Campus - Abertillery Learning Community (Secondary)
ALC Tillery Street Campus (Primary)
Roseheyworth Road Campus (Primary)
Six Bells Primary Campus (Primary)

References

External links

Secondary schools in Blaenau Gwent
Educational institutions established in 1986

1986 establishments in Wales

Comprehensive School